Kwaluseni is an inkhundla of Eswatini, located in the Manzini District. Its population as of the 2007 census was 41,780. It is divided in two imiphakatsi:
 Logoba
 Kwalusenimhlane

References
Statoids.com, retrieved December 11, 2010

Populated places in Manzini Region